Eketāhuna is a small rural settlement, in the south of the Tararua District and the Manawatū-Whanganui region of New Zealand's North Island.

The town is located at eastern foot of the Tararua Ranges, 35 kilometres north of Masterton and a similar distance south of Palmerston North. It is situated on State Highway 2, on the eastern bank of the Mākākahi River.

Eketāhuna has become synonymous with stereotypes of remote rural New Zealand towns, with New Zealanders colloquially referring to the town in the same way other English speakers refer to Timbuktu.

The New Zealand Ministry for Culture and Heritage gives a translation of "land on the sandbank" for Eketāhuna. The name sounds like a sentence in Afrikaans which translates to "I have a chicken", making it amusing to immigrant Afrikaans-speaking South Africans in New Zealand.

Geography

The corresponding Statistics New Zealand statistical area covers an area of 892.66 km².

The Pukaha / Mount Bruce National Wildlife Centre is located to the south of the town.

History

Early settlement

Eketāhuna was settled in 1872, under the name Mellemskov. It was renamed soon after its founding.

Modern history

The population of Eketāhuna and the wider area has plummeted in the 21st century, dropping from 1,920 in 1996 to just 630 in 2013.

On 20 January 2014, the town was the epicenter of the 2014 Eketāhuna earthquake. Measuring 6.2 on the Richter magnitude scale, the quake caused moderate damage all over the southern North Island.

In July 2020, the name of the town was officially gazetted as Eketāhuna by the New Zealand Geographic Board.

Demography

The population of Eketāhuna was 504 in the 2018 New Zealand census, an increase of 60 (13.5%) since the 2013 census, and an increase of 48 (10.5%) since the 2006 census. There were 255 males and 252 females, giving a sex ratio of 1.01 males per female. Ethnicities were 429 people  (85.1%) European/Pākehā, 158 (31.3%) Māori, 15 (3.0%) Pacific peoples, and 12 (2.4%) Asian (totals add to more than 100% since people could identify with multiple ethnicities). Of the total population, 84 people  (16.7%) were under 15 years old, 87 (17.3%) were 15–29, 231 (45.8%) were 30–64, and 102 (20.2%) were over 65.

Nireaha-Eketāhuna

Nireaha-Eketāhuna, which also includes Alfredton, had a population of 1,566 at the 2018 New Zealand census, an increase of 114 people (7.9%) since the 2013 census, and an increase of 69 people (4.6%) since the 2006 census. There were 597 households. There were 816 males and 750 females, giving a sex ratio of 1.09 males per female. The median age was 37.7 years (compared with 37.4 years nationally), with 366 people (23.4%) aged under 15 years, 261 (16.7%) aged 15 to 29, 726 (46.4%) aged 30 to 64, and 207 (13.2%) aged 65 or older.

Ethnicities were 89.8% European/Pākehā, 22.6% Māori, 1.1% Pacific peoples, 1.7% Asian, and 1.9% other ethnicities (totals add to more than 100% since people could identify with multiple ethnicities).

The proportion of people born overseas was 8.8%, compared with 27.1% nationally.

Although some people objected to giving their religion, 57.7% had no religion, 28.0% were Christian, 0.4% were Hindu, 0.2% were Buddhist and 3.3% had other religions.

Of those at least 15 years old, 138 (11.5%) people had a bachelor or higher degree, and 291 (24.2%) people had no formal qualifications. The median income was $27,600, compared with $31,800 nationally. The employment status of those at least 15 was that 594 (49.5%) people were employed full-time, 246 (20.5%) were part-time, and 60 (5.0%) were unemployed.

Economy

In 2018, 5.0% of the workforce worked in manufacturing, 6.1% worked in construction, 5.0% worked in hospitality, 1.4% worked in transport, 3.9% worked in education, and 6.4% worked in healthcare.

Transport

As of 2018, among those who commute to work, 46.4% drove a car, 3.2% rode in a car and 2.9% walked or jogged. No one commuted by public transport or cycled.

Education

Notable people
 Ellen Anderson (1882–1978), district nurse in Eketāhuna
Tania Lineham, born 1966 in Eketāhuna. Royal Society of New Zealand, Science and Technology Teacher Fellowship in 1999 and the Prime Minister's Science Teacher Prize in 2015.

See also
List of towns in New Zealand
Regions of New Zealand

Notes

External links

 

Populated places in Manawatū-Whanganui
Tararua District